Category 5 severe tropical cyclones are tropical cyclones that reach Category 5 intensity on the Australian tropical cyclone intensity scale within the Australian region. They are by definition the strongest tropical cyclones that can form on Earth. A total of 48 recorded tropical cyclones have peaked at Category 5 strength in the Australian region, which is denoted as the part of the Southern Hemisphere between 90°E and 160°E. The earliest tropical cyclone to be classified as a Category 5 severe tropical cyclone was Pam which was classified as a Category 5 between February 3 – 5, 1974, as it moved through the Coral Sea. The latest system to be classified as a Category 5 severe tropical cyclone was Darian, which was classified during 21 December 2022 in the open Indian Ocean.

Background
The Australian region tropical cyclone basin is located to the south of the Equator between 90°E and 160°E and is officially monitored by the Indonesian Badan Meteorologi, Klimatologi, dan Geofisika (BMKG), Australian Bureau of Meteorology and the Papua New Guinea National Weather Service. Other meteorological services such as New Zealand's MetService, Météo-France as well as the Fiji Meteorological Service and the United States Joint Typhoon Warning Center monitor the basin. Within the basin this scale is not officially used, however, systems are commonly compared to the SSHWS using 1-minute sustained wind speeds from the United States Joint Typhoon Warning Center. On both scales, a Category 5 tropical cyclone is expected to cause widespread devastation, if it significantly impacts land at or near its peak intensity.

20th century

|-
| Trixie ||  ||  ||  || Western Australia ||  ||  ||
|-
| Beverley ||   ||  ||  || Western Australia ||  || ||
|-
| Joan ||  ||  ||  || Western Australia ||  ||  ||
|-
| Alby ||  ||  ||  || Western Australia ||  ||  ||
|-
| Amy ||  ||  ||   || Indonesia, Western Australia || || ||
|-
| Dean ||  ||  ||   || Indonesia, Northern Australia || || ||
|-
| Enid ||  ||  ||   || Western Australia || || ||
|-
| Carol ||  ||  ||  || Indonesia || || ||
|-
| Mabel ||  ||  ||  || Western Australia || || ||
|-
| Dominic ||  ||  ||  || Northern Australia, New Guinea || || ||
|-
| Elinor ||  ||  ||  || Queensland || Minor || ||
|-
| Kathy ||   ||  ||  || Cape York Peninsula, Northern Territory ||  ||  ||
|-
| Harry ||  ||  ||  || Vanuatu, New Caledonia || || ||
|-
| Aivu ||  ||  ||  || Queensland ||  ||  ||
|-
| Orson ||  ||  ||  || Western Australia ||  ||  ||
|-
| Alex ||  ||  ||  ||  Indonesia, Christmas Island || || ||
|-
| Graham ||  ||  ||  || Sumatra, Cocos Islands, Christmas Island  || || ||
|-
| Neville ||  ||  ||  || Northern Territory || || ||
|-
| Rewa ||  ||  ||  || New Caledonia, New Zealand, Papua New GuineaQueensland, Solomon Islands, Vanuatu || Unknown ||  ||
|-
|Theodore ||  ||  ||  || Solomon Islands, Papua New GuineaVanuatu, New CaledoniaNorfolk Island, New Zealand || || ||
|-
| Chloe ||  ||  ||  || Timor, Western Australia ||  ||  ||
|-
| Pancho-Helinda ||  ||   ||  || Sumatra, Cocos (Keeling) Islands, Madagascar || || ||
|-
| Thelma ||  ||   ||  || Northern Territory, Western Australia  || N/A ||  ||
|-
| Frederic–Evrina ||  ||  ||  || None || None || None ||
|-
| Vance ||   ||  ||  || Northern Territory, Western Australia ||  ||  ||
|-
| Gwenda ||  ||  ||  || Timor, Indonesia, Western Australia ||  || ||
|-
| John ||  ||  ||  || Timor, Indonesia, Western Australia ||  || None ||
|}

21st century

|-
| Paul ||  ||  ||  || None ||  ||  ||
|-
| Rosita ||  ||  ||  || Indonesia, Western Australia, Northern Territory ||  ||  ||
|-
| Sam ||  ||  ||  || Northern Territory, Western Australia ||  ||  ||
|-
| Chris ||  ||  ||   || Western Australia ||  ||  ||
|-
| Inigo ||  ||  ||  || Eastern Indonesia, Timor, Western Australia ||  ||  ||
|-
| Fay ||  ||  ||   || Northern Territory, Timor, Western Australia ||  ||  ||
|-
| Ingrid ||  ||  ||  || New Guinea, Northern Australia ||  ||  ||
|-
| Glenda ||  ||  ||  || Northern Territory, Western Australia ||  ||  ||
|-
| Monica ||  ||  ||  || New Guinea, Northern Australia ||  ||   ||
|-
| George ||  ||  ||  || Northern Territory, Western Australia ||  ||  ||
|-
| Hamish ||  ||  ||  || Queensland ||  ||  ||
|-
| Laurence ||  ||  ||  || Northern Territory, Western Australia ||  ||  ||
|-
| Yasi ||  ||  ||  || Vanuatu, Solomon Islands, Australia ||  || 1 ||
|-
| Gillian ||  ||  ||   || New Guinea, Indonesia, QueenslandNorthern Territory, Christmas Island ||  ||  ||
|-
| Ita ||  ||  ||  || Solomon Islands, Papua New Guinea, Queensland ||  ||  ||
|-
| Marcia ||  ||  ||  || Queensland, New South Wales ||  ||  ||
|-
| Ernie ||  ||  ||  || None ||  ||  ||
|-
| Marcus ||  ||  ||  || Northern Territory, Western Australia ||  ||  ||
|-
| Veronica ||  ||  ||  || Western Australia || || ||
|-
| Niran ||  ||  ||  || Queensland, New Caledonia ||  ||  ||
|-
| Darian ||  ||  ||  || None ||  ||  ||
|}

Other systems
In addition to the 43 tropical cyclones listed above, three other tropical cyclones are considered by the BoM to have been a Category 5 severe tropical cyclone within the Australian region. These are Cyclone Mahina of 1899 and two tropical cyclones that struck Innisfail and Mackay during 1918. Severe tropical cyclone's Erica (2003) and Harold (2020) became Category 5 severe tropical cyclones, after they moved out of the Australian region and into the South Pacific basin. became Severe Tropical Cyclones Fran (1992) and Beni (2003) were Category 5 severe tropical cyclones, before they moved into the Australian region from the South Pacific basin. Severe Tropical Cyclone Ului weakened into a Category 4 severe tropical cyclone, as it moved across 160°E into the Australian region.

The BoM estimates that Severe Tropical cyclones Viola–Claudette (1979), Jane–Irna (1992), Daryl–Agnielle (1995) and Bruce (2013) peaked as Category 5 severe tropical cyclones, after they had moved out of the Australian region and into the South-West Indian Ocean.

During December 21, 2022 Severe Tropical Cyclone Darian moved into the South-West Indian Ocean as a Category 5 Severe Tropical cyclone, where it was immediately classified as a Very Intense Tropical Cyclone.

Impacts
Category 5 severe tropical cyclones are expected to cause widespread devastation if they significantly impact land.

See also
List of Category 5 Atlantic hurricanes
List of Category 5 Pacific hurricanes

References

External links

Australian